

Peerage of England

|rowspan="3"|Duke of Cornwall (1337)||none||1413||1421||
|-
|Henry Plantagenet||1421||1422||
|-
|none||1422||1453||
|-
|rowspan="2"|Duke of York (1385)||None||1415||1426||Under attainder
|-
|Richard of York, 3rd Duke of York||1426||1460||Peerage restored
|-
|rowspan="2"|Duke of Norfolk (1397)||none||1399||1424||(Deprived of the title)
|-
|John de Mowbray, 2nd Duke of Norfolk||1424||1432||Restored
|-
|Duke of Clarence (1412)||Thomas of Lancaster, 1st Duke of Clarence||1412||1421||Died, title extinct
|-
|Duke of Bedford (1414)||John of Lancaster, 1st Duke of Bedford||1414||1435||
|-
|Duke of Gloucester (1414)||Humphrey of Lancaster, 1st Duke of Gloucester||1414||1447||
|-
|Duke of Exeter (1416)||Thomas Beaufort, Duke of Exeter||1416||1426||Died, title extinct
|-
|Earl of Warwick (1088)||Richard de Beauchamp, 13th Earl of Warwick||1401||1439||
|-
|rowspan="2"|Earl of Arundel (1138)||John FitzAlan, 13th Earl of Arundel||1415||1421||Died
|-
|John FitzAlan, 14th Earl of Arundel||1421||1435||
|-
|Earl of Oxford (1142)||John de Vere, 12th Earl of Oxford||1417||1462||
|-
|Earl of Norfolk (1312)||John de Mowbray, 5th Earl of Norfolk||1405||1432||Restored as Duke, see above
|-
|Earl of March (1328)||Edmund Mortimer, 5th Earl of March||1398||1425||Died, succeeded by Richard Plantagenet, who was restored as Duke of York in 1326, see above
|-
|rowspan="2"|Earl of Devon (1335)||Hugh de Courtenay, 4th Earl of Devon||1419||1422||Died
|-
|Thomas de Courtenay, 5th Earl of Devon||1422||1458||
|-
|rowspan="2"|Earl of Salisbury (1337)||Thomas Montacute, 4th Earl of Salisbury||1409||1428||Died
|-
|Alice Montacute, 5th Countess of Salisbury||1428||1462||
|-
|Earl of Stafford (1351)||Humphrey Stafford, 6th Earl of Stafford||1403||1460||
|-
|Earl of Suffolk (1385)||William de la Pole, 4th Earl of Suffolk||1415||1450||
|-
|Earl of Huntingdon (1387)||John Holland, 2nd Earl of Huntingdon||1417||1447||
|-
|Earl of Somerset (1397)||John Beaufort, 3rd Earl of Somerset||1418||1444||
|-
|rowspan="2"|Earl of Westmorland (1397)||Ralph Neville, 1st Earl of Westmorland||1397||1425||Died
|-
|Ralph Neville, 2nd Earl of Westmorland||1425||1484||
|-
|Earl of Northumberland (1416)||Henry Percy, 2nd Earl of Northumberland||1416||1455||
|-
|Earl of Worcester (1421)||Richard de Beauchamp, 1st Earl of Worcester||1421||1422||New creation; died, title became extinct
|-
|rowspan="2"|Baron de Ros (1264)||John de Ros, 7th Baron de Ros||1414||1421||
|-
|Thomas de Ros, 8th Baron de Ros||1421||1431||
|-
|Baron Fauconberg (1295)||Joan Neville, 6th Baroness Fauconberg||1429||1490||
|- 
|Baron FitzWalter (1295)||Walter FitzWalter, 7th Baron FitzWalter||1415||1431||
|- 
|rowspan="2"|Baron FitzWarine (1295)||Fulke FitzWarine, 7th Baron FitzWarine||1407||1420||Died
|- 
|Elizabet FitzWarine, suo jure Baroness FitzWarine||1420||1428||Died, Barony fell into abeyance, until 1433
|- 
|Baron Grey de Wilton (1295)||Richard Grey, 6th Baron Grey de Wilton||1396||1442||
|-
|Baron Clinton (1299)||William de Clinton, 4th Baron Clinton||1398||1431||
|- 
|rowspan="2"|Baron De La Warr (1299)||Thomas la Warr, 5th Baron De La Warr||1398||1427||Died
|- 
|Reginald West, 6th Baron De La Warr||1427||1450||
|- 
|Baron Ferrers of Chartley (1299)||Edmund de Ferrers, 6th Baron Ferrers of Chartley||1413||1435||
|- 
|Baron Lovel (1299)||William Lovel, 7th Baron Lovel||1414||1455||
|- 
|Baron Scales (1299)||Thomas de Scales, 7th Baron Scales||1419||1460||
|- 
|rowspan="2"|Baron Welles (1299)||John de Welles, 5th Baron Welles||1361||1421||Died
|- 
|Lionel de Welles, 6th Baron Welles||1421||1461||
|- 
|rowspan="2"|Baron de Clifford (1299)||John Clifford, 7th Baron de Clifford||1391-3||1422||Died
|- 
|Thomas Clifford, 8th Baron de Clifford||1422||1455||
|- 
|Baron Ferrers of Groby (1299)||William Ferrers, 5th Baron Ferrers of Groby||1388||1445||
|- 
|Baron Furnivall (1299)||John Talbot, 6th Baron Furnivall||1407||1453||jure uxoris
|- 
|Baron Latimer (1299)||John Nevill, 6th Baron Latimer||1395||1430||
|- 
|Baron Morley (1299)||Thomas de Morley, 5th Baron Morley||1416||1435||
|- 
|Baron Strange of Knockyn (1299)||Richard le Strange, 7th Baron Strange of Knockyn||1397||1449||
|- 
|Baron Zouche of Haryngworth (1308)||William la Zouche, 5th Baron Zouche||1415||1463||
|- 
|Baron Beaumont (1309)||John Beaumont, 6th Baron Beaumont||1416||1460||
|- 
|Baron Strange of Blackmere (1309)||Ankaret Talbot, 9th Baroness Strange of Blackmere||1419||1421||Died, Barony was succeeded by John Talbot, Baron Furnivall and Talbot (see above), and held by his heirs until 1616, when it fell into abeyance
|- 
|Baron Audley of Heleigh (1313)||James Tuchet, 5th Baron Audley||1408||1459||
|- 
|Baron Cobham of Kent (1313)||Joan Oldcastle, 4th Baroness Cobham||1408||1434||
|- 
|Baron Cherleton (1313)||Edward Cherleton, 5th Baron Cherleton||1401||1421||Died, Barony fell into abeyance
|- 
|Baron Willoughby de Eresby (1313)||Robert Willoughby, 6th Baron Willoughby de Eresby||1409||1452||
|- 
|Baron Holand (1314)||Maud de Holland, suo jure Baroness Holand||1373||1420||Died; Barony was succeeded by Baron Lovel, and held by his heirs until 1487, when it was forfeited
|- 
|Baron Dacre (1321)||Thomas Dacre, 6th Baron Dacre||1398||1458||
|- 
|rowspan="2"|Baron FitzHugh (1321)||Henry FitzHugh, 3rd Baron FitzHugh||1386||1425||Died
|- 
|William FitzHugh, 4th Baron FitzHugh||1425||1452||
|- 
|Baron Greystock (1321)||John de Greystock, 4th Baron Greystock||1417||1436||
|- 
|Baron Grey of Ruthin (1325)||Reginald Grey, 3rd Baron Grey de Ruthyn||1388||1441||
|- 
|Baron Harington (1326)||William Harington, 5th Baron Harington||1418||1458||
|- 
|Baron Burghersh (1330)||Isabel le Despencer, suo jure Baroness Burgersh||1414||1440||
|- 
|Baron Poynings (1337)||Robert Poynings, 5th Baron Poynings||1387||1446||
|- 
|Baron Bourchier (1342)||Elizabeth Bourchier, suo jure Baroness Bourchier||1409||1433||
|- 
|Baron Burnell (1350)||Hugh Burnell, 2nd Baron Burnell||1383||1420||Died, Barony fell into abeyance
|- 
|Baron Scrope of Masham (1350)||John Scrope, 4th Baron Scrope of Masham||1426||1455||Restored, after the title was under attainder
|- 
|Baron Saint Maur (1351)||Alice St Maur, suo jure Baroness Saint Maur||1409||1426||Died, title succeeded by more senior Baron Zouche, and held by his heirs until 1626, when both titles fell into abeyance
|- 
|Baron Lisle (1357)||Elizabeth de Berkeley, 4th Baroness Lisle||1392||1420||Died, Barony fell into abeyance
|- 
|Baron Botreaux (1368)||William de Botreaux, 3rd Baron Botreaux||1392||1462||
|- 
|rowspan="2"|Baron Scrope of Bolton (1371)||Richard Scrope, 3rd Baron Scrope of Bolton||1403||1420||Died
|- 
|Henry Scrope, 4th Baron Scrope of Bolton||1420||1459||
|- 
|Baron Cromwell (1375)||Ralph de Cromwell, 3rd Baron Cromwell||1417||1455||
|- 
|Baron Camoys (1383)||Thomas de Camoys, 2nd Baron Camoys||1419||1426||Died; Barony fell into abeyance, until 1839
|- 
|Baron le Despencer (1387)||Philip le Despencer, 2nd Baron le Despencer||1401||1424||Died, Barony became dormant
|- 
|rowspan="2"|Baron Bergavenny (1392)||Richard de Beauchamp, 2nd Baron Bergavenny||1411||1421||Died
|- 
|Elizabeth de Beauchamp, suo jure Baroness Bergavenny||1421||1447||
|- 
|Baron Grey of Codnor (1397)||John Grey, 2nd Baron Grey of Codnor||1418||1431||
|- 
|Baron West (1402)||Reginald West, 3rd Baron West||1415||1450||In 1427 succeeded to the more senior Barony de la Warr, both titles held by his heirs until 1554, when they fell into abeyance
|- 
|Baron Berkeley (1421)||James Berkeley, 1st Baron Berkeley||1421||1463||New creation
|- 
|Baron Hungerford (1426)||Walter Hungerford, 1st Baron Hungerford||1426||1449||New creation
|- 
|Baron Tiptoft (1426)||John de Tiptoft, 1st Baron Tiptoft||1426||1443||New creation
|- 
|}

Peerage of Scotland

|Duke of Rothesay (1398)||-||1406||1430||
|-
|rowspan=2|Duke of Albany (1398)||Robert Stewart, Duke of Albany||1398||1420||Died
|-
|Murdoch Stewart, Duke of Albany||1420||1425||Attainted and his titles were forfeited
|-
|Earl of Mar (1114)||Alexander Stewart, Earl of Mar||1408||1435||
|-
|rowspan=2|Earl of Dunbar (1115)||George I, Earl of March||1368||1420||Died
|-
|George II, Earl of March||1420||1457||
|-
|Earl of Menteith (1160)||Murdoch Stewart, Earl of Menteith||1390||1425||Succeeded as Duke of Albany; attainted, see above
|-
|rowspan=2|Earl of Lennox (1184)||Donnchadh, Earl of Lennox||1385||1425||Died
|-
|Isabella, Countess of Lennox||1425||1458||
|-
|rowspan=2|Earl of Ross (1215)||Mariota, Countess of Ross||1415||1429||Died
|-
|Alexander of Islay, Earl of Ross||1429||1449||
|-
|rowspan=2|Earl of Sutherland (1235)||Robert de Moravia, 6th Earl of Sutherland||1370||1427||Died
|-
|John de Moravia, 7th Earl of Sutherland||1427||1460||
|-
|rowspan=2|Earl of Douglas (1358)||Archibald Douglas, 4th Earl of Douglas||1400||1424||Died
|-
|Archibald Douglas, 5th Earl of Douglas||14240||1439||
|-
|rowspan=2|Earl of Strathearn (1371)||Malise Graham, Earl of Strathearn||1410||1427||Deprived of the peerage
|-
|Walter Stewart, Earl of Atholl||1427||1437||
|-
|rowspan=4|Earl of Moray (1372)||Thomas Dunbar, 5th Earl of Moray||1391||1422||Died
|-
|Thomas Dunbar, 6th Earl of Moray||1422||142?||Died
|-
|James Dunbar, 7th Earl of Moray||142?||1429||Died
|-
|Elizabeth Dunbar, 8th Countess of Moray||1429||1455||
|-
|Earl of Orkney (1379)||William Sinclair, Earl of Orkney||1410||1476||
|-
|rowspan=2|Earl of Buchan (1382)||John Stewart, Earl of Buchan||1406||1424||Died
|-
|Robert Stewart, Earl of Buchan||1424||1431||
|-
|Earl of Angus (1389)||William Douglas, 2nd Earl of Angus||1403||1437||
|-
|Earl of Crawford (1398)||Alexander Lindsay, 2nd Earl of Crawford||1407||1439||
|-
|Earl of Atholl (1404)||Walter Stewart, Earl of Atholl||1404||1437||
|-
|Earl of Menteith (1427)||Malise Graham, 1st Earl of Menteith||1427||1490||New creation
|-
|Lord Erskine (1427)||Robert Erskine, 1st Lord Erskine||1429||1453||New creation
|-
|Lord Hay (1427)||William Hay, 1st Lord Hay||1429||1462||New creation
|-
|}

Peerage of Ireland

|rowspan=2|Earl of Ulster (1264)||Edmund Mortimer, 7th Earl of Ulster||1398||1425||Died
|-
|Richard of York, 8th Earl of Ulster||1425||1460||
|-
|Earl of Kildare (1316)||Gerald FitzGerald, 5th Earl of Kildare||1390||1432||
|-
|Earl of Ormond (1328)||James Butler, 4th Earl of Ormond||1405||1452||
|-
|rowspan=2|Earl of Desmond (1329)||Thomas FitzGerald, 5th Earl of Desmond||1399||1420||Died
|-
|James FitzGerald, 6th Earl of Desmond||1420||1463||
|-
|rowspan=2|Baron Athenry (1172)||Walter de Bermingham||1374||1428||Died
|-
|Thomas II de Bermingham||1428||1473||
|-
|Baron Kingsale (1223)||Nicholas de Courcy, 10th Baron Kingsale||1410||1430||
|-
|Baron Kerry (1223)||Thomas Fitzmaurice, 8th Baron Kerry||1410||1469||
|-
|rowspan=2|Baron Barry (1261)||John Barry, 7th Baron Barry||1392||1420||Died
|-
|William Barry, 8th Baron Barry||1420||1480||
|-
|rowspan=2|Baron Gormanston (1370)||Christopher Preston, 2nd Baron Gormanston||1396||1422||Died
|-
|Christopher Preston, 3rd Baron Gormanston||1422||1450||
|-
|Baron Slane (1370)||Thomas Fleming, 2nd Baron Slane||1370||1435||
|-
|Baron Howth (1425)||Christopher St Lawrence, 1st Baron Howth||1425||1430||New creation
|-
|}

References

 

Lists of peers by decade
1420s in England
1420s in Ireland
15th century in England
15th century in Scotland
15th century in Ireland
15th-century English people
15th-century Scottish peers
15th-century Irish people
Peers